Orgest is an Albanian masculine given name. Notable people bearing the name Orgest include:

Orgest Buzi (born 1994), Albanian footballer 
Orgest Gava (born 1990), Albanian footballer
Orgest Serjani (born 1988), Albanian footballer

Masculine given names
Albanian masculine given names